Tomás Vicente de la Noval (January 22, 1914 – February 25, 1981) was a Cuban outfielder who played in the Negro leagues in the 1930s.

A native of Guanabacoa, Cuba, Noval played for the Cuban Stars (East) in 1935. In three recorded games, he posted two hits in six plate appearances. Noval died in Miami, Florida in 1981 at age 67.

References

External links
Baseball statistics and player information from Baseball-Reference Black Baseball Stats and Seamheads

1914 births
1981 deaths
Cuban Stars (East) players
Baseball outfielders
Baseball players from Havana